The Småland Regiment, designations I 12 and I 12/Fo 17, was a Swedish Army infantry regiment that traced its origins back to the 16th century. The unit was disbanded as a result of the disarmament policies set forward in the Defence Act of 2000.

History 
The regiment was formed in 1928 as Jönköping-Kalmar Regiment (I 12), following a merger of Jönköping Regiment (I 12), and the Kalmar Regiment (I 21). The regiment moved the same year to the Eksjö garrison.

In 1948 the regiment changed its name to Northern Småland Regiment (I 12). On July 1, 1974 the regiment formed with Jonkopings defense area (Fo 17) a defensive field regiment to be known as The 12/Fo 17. When both the Kronoberg Regiment (I 11) and Kalmar Regiment (For 18) were dismantled in 1997, Smålands regiment took over responsibility for Kronobergs defense area (Fo 16) and Kalmar defense area (Fo 18) and integrated the Jönköping defense area, which then formed Smålands defense area (For 17).

Heraldry and traditions

Colours, standards and guidons
When the regiment was raised it carried two colours from the two disbanded regiments Jönköping Regiment and Kalmar Regiment. A new regimental colour was presented to the Northern Småland Regiment (I 12) in Eksjö by His Majesty the King Gustaf VI Adolf on 11 September 1954 which replaced the two older ones. It was used as regimental colour by I 12 until 1 July 2000. The colour is drawn by Brita Grep and embroidered by hand in insertion technique probably by the company Libraria. The battle honours from the two previous regiments were now added to the new colour. Blazon: "On a quarterly cloth on the first and fourth bays the provincial badge of Småland; on yellow a red lion rampant, armed blue, in the forepaws a red crossbow with white arrowhead and black bow, string and trigger (a legacy from the former Kalmar Regiment, I 21), on the second and third bays the town badge of Jönköping; on red, from a blue wavy base a tripletowered white castle embattled issuant, windows and gates black and a hoisted white gate grill (a legacy from the former Jönköping Regiment, I 12). On a red border at the upper side of the colour, battle honours (Lützen 1632, Wittstock 1636, Warsaw 1656, Landskrona 1677, Klisow 1702, Malatitze 1708, Hälsingborg 1710 in yellow."

Coat of arms
The coat of the arms of the Northern Småland Regiment (I 12/Fo 17) 1977–1994. Blazon: "Quarterly: I and IV or, the provincial badge of Småland, a double-tailed lion rampant gules armed and langued azure, in the forepaws a crossbow gules, arrow-head argent, bow and string sable. II and III gules, the town badge of Jönköping, from a wavy base azure a castle triple-towered and embattled issuant argent; masoned of the first. Windows and portcullis sable and raised gate grill argent. The shield surmounted two muskets in saltire or". The coat of arms of the Northern Småland Regiment (I 12/Fo 17) 1994–1998, Småland Regiment (I 12/Fo 17) 1998–2000 and the Northern Småland Group since 2000. Blazon: "Quarterly: I and IV or, the provincial badge of Småland, a double-tailed lion rampant gules armed and langued azure, in the forepaws a crossbow gules, arrow-head argent, bow and string sable. II and III gules, the town badge of Jönköping, from a wavy base azure a castle triple towered and embattled issuant argent; masoned of the first. Windows and portcullis sable and raised gate grill argent. The shield surmounted two swords in saltire or".

Medals
The medal has different obverses. The medal ribbon is of yellow moiré with broad red edges and a blue stripe on the middle and a red line on each side.

Heritage
The regiment continued the traditions of Jönköping Regiment and Kalmar Regiment, and from 1985 the memory of the Småland Artillery Regiment was retained at the regiment. When Kalmar Regiment was raised again in 1994, the traditions were continued by the new regiment. After the regiment and the Småland Brigade (IB 12) was disbanded, its traditions were continued by Northern Småland Group (NSG). From 1 July 2013, Northern Småland Battalion, within the Northern Småland Group, is the traditional keeper of Småland Regiment.

Commanding officers
Regimental officers active at the regiment from 1928 to 2000.

Commanders

1928–1935: Fredrik Lovén
1935–1938: Hjalmar Falk
1938–1942: Sixten Wockatz
1939–1940: Sven Ryman (acting)
1942–1945: Gunnar Hagbergh
1945–1949: Nils Ludvig Verner Göth
1949–1952: Hadar Folke Johannes Cars
1952–1958: Per Alvar Haldan Lindencrona
1958–1963: Gösta Vilhelm Sahlén
1963–1970: Carl Werner Robert Liborius von Mentzer
1970–1976: Nils Fredrik Haegerström
1976–1978: Stig Sjögren
1978–1984: Senior colonel Lars Anders Andersson
1984–1987: Sven Erik Anton Nilsson
1987–1991: Torbjörn Tillman
1991–1991: Karl Olof Eklöf
1992–1999: Wilhelm af Donner
1999–2000: Thore Ingvar Levin Bäckman

Deputy commanders
1976–????: Colonel Tore Bremer

Names, designations and locations

See also
List of Swedish infantry regiments

Footnotes

References

Notes

Print

Further reading

External links

www.skillingaryd.nu (Swedish)

Infantry regiments of the Swedish Army
Disbanded units and formations of Sweden
Military units and formations established in 1928
Military units and formations disestablished in 2000
1928 establishments in Sweden
2000 disestablishments in Sweden
Eksjö Garrison